Love Inc. were a Canadian Eurodance music group from Toronto, Ontario. The group was formed by DJ/remixer/producers Chris Sheppard and Brad Daymond, with Simone Denny on vocals. The Sheppard and Denny combination previously worked together in the Quality Records dance outfit BKS, an acronym using the surname initials of Zambian born Hennie Bekker, Greg Kavanagh and Sheppard.

Musical career
The group scored its first major hit on the Canadian pop chart with "Broken Bones", which won Best Video at the 1998 MuchMusic Video Awards. "Broken Bones" peaked at number 6 (Canadian Airplay) and #23 (Top 100 singles) in 1998, and was followed that same year by "You're a Superstar". "You're a Superstar" also became the band's only hit in the United States, where it peaked at number 22 on the Billboard Hot Dance Music/Club Play chart in 1999. The singles "Who Do You Love" and "Homeless" followed in 1999.

In 1999, Daymond left the group to pursue a successful remix and production career with Alex Greggs as "Riprock & Alex G". After Love Inc.'s self-titled album was released, Sheppard and Denny continued as a duo and in 2000 released Into the Night, which included the title track, "Come On (It's Only Love)" and "Here Comes the Sunshine". It would also be their last album. Five singles in total reached the # 1 position on the Canadian Dance Charts published by the now-defunct publications The Record and RPM Magazine.

The group's debut album remains the only dance album created domestically in Canada to achieve platinum certification (sales over 100,000 units).

Aside the aforementioned Alex Greggs (who with Daymond moved on to work with NSYNC and others), Love Inc. were also aided by Frankfurt-based pop dance innovator Peter Ries, who co-produced both albums with the band. Other participants included composer Vincent DeGiorgio and Germany's Doug Laurent and award-winning songwriter/artist Dan Hill.

A few years after their break up, they would achieve success overseas when "You're a Superstar" and "Broken Bones" became hits in the UK and Ireland. "You're a Superstar" spent four weeks at number 7 in the UK Singles Chart in December 2002, and "Broken Bones" reached number 8 in May 2003. "Do Ya (Feel The Love)", co-written with Ms. Denny, was also featured on the initial Queer As Folk soundtrack, released on RCA Victor worldwide. You're a Superstar was featured on the Christmas special series finale of The Office as music in the background.

In 2003, Denny provided the vocals for Widelife's track "All Things (Just Keep Getting Better)", the theme from Queer Eye For The Straight Guy.

In 2013, Denny returned to performing with a touring version of Love Inc., this time billing themselves as "Love Inc. Featuring Simone Denny," performing the band's songs at nightclubs across Canada.

Brad Daymond (born Bradley Daymond Ralph on February 22, 1970 in Missisauga, Ontario, Canada) died on August 3, 2018 from complications after a cardiac arrest he had suffered three months earlier, at the age of 48.

An unrelated band of the same name released a single called "Love is the Message" in 1991, which in February of that year charted for three weeks, peaking at number 59 on the UK Singles Chart.

Legacy
"Broken Bones" would be used as a sampled track on Canadian rapper Belly's 2011 single "Purple Drugs," using the main lyrics from "Broken Bones" ("...Take a ride on a purple airplane, honey I don't know when I'll be back again") as the basis for the song.

Discography

Studio albums

Singles

Notes

References

External links
ViK. Recordings: Love Inc.
Canoe/Jam!: Love Inc.

Canadian house music groups
Musical groups established in 1998
Musical groups disestablished in 2000
Musical groups from Toronto
Juno Award for Dance Recording of the Year winners
Canadian Eurodance groups
Canadian musical trios
1998 establishments in Ontario
2000 disestablishments in Ontario